Khvoshnam or Khowshnam or Khushnam may refer to:

Khvoshnam, Lorestan
Khvoshnam, Tehran
Khvoshnam, Zanjan